Cecilia Frank (born 1963) is a Swedish graphic designer, Cecilia Frank has a master's degree in Graphic Design & Illustration from University College of Arts, Crafts and Design (Konstfack) in Stockholm in 1990. Together with her husband Nikolaus Frank she runs the design firm Frank Etc. AB i Stockholm, where she focusses on conceptual design based on future technology, corporate identities and design of educational material.

Cecilia Frank has designed information and exhibitions for official purposes, such as the City of Stockholm. Has worked at different design studios in England. Has done descriptive illustrations for various encyclopedias, and worked for publishing firms, particularly with education, designed  product graphics and material related to music. She has been part of project groups related to future technology. Cecilia Frank has received many recognitions, i.e. several Good Design Awards  and several Excellent Swedish Design-awards. She has also received awards in several international design competitions, such as LG Electronics International Design Competition and MA Prize 2012.

Literature
Design:Stockholm, Stockholms Stadsmuseum,

Sources
 futureMobility;thinkWearable 
 CD-design Claude Loyola Allgén 
 NordLead synthesizer 
 Book design

See also
 Graphic design

References

Swedish designers
1963 births
Living people
Konstfack alumni